Yohmor is a village in the Nabatieh Governorate of Lebanon. It is located about 8 km from the town of Nabatieh. Beaufort Castle is located nearby the village.

History
In  the 1596 tax records, it was named as a village,  Yuhmur, in the Ottoman nahiya (subdistrict) of  Sagif   under the liwa' (district) of Safad, with a population of  42 households and 5 bachelors, all Muslim. The villagers paid a fixed  tax-rate of 25 %  on  agricultural products, such as wheat, barley, olive trees,  goats and beehives, in addition to "occasional revenues" and a press for olive oil or grape syrup; a total of 4,800  akçe.

The village has a population of about 2,000, although the population swells to a much higher number in the summer. The residents are Shia Muslims. Prime agricultural crops include olives and tobacco.

References

Bibliography

External links
Yohmor (Nabatiyeh), Localiban

Populated places in Nabatieh District
Shia Muslim communities in Lebanon